The 1976 Australian Sports Sedan Championship was a CAMS sanctioned Australian motor racing title open to Group B Sports Sedans. The title, which was the inaugural Australian Sports Sedan Championship, was won by Allan Moffat, driving a Chevrolet Monza and a Ford Capri RS3100.

Calendar
The championship was contested over a seven-round series with two heats per round.

Points system
Championship points were awarded on a 9-6-4-3-2-1 basis to the six best placed drivers at each round.

Results

References

Further reading
 Gardner Heads Richards, Auto Action, 9 December 1976, pages 18 & 20

External links
 www.autopics.com.au > Touring Cars > Touring Cars 1970s > Touring Cars 1976

National Sports Sedan Series
Sports Sedan Championship